Anton Rücker (born 13 February 2001) is a German footballer who plays as a defender for BFC Dynamo.

Career

In 2020, Rücker signed for Leixões in the Portuguese second division from the youth academy of German Bundesliga side RB Leipzig.

References

External links
 

2001 births
People from Eilenburg
Living people
German footballers
Association football defenders
Germany youth international footballers
Leixões S.C. players
Berliner FC Dynamo players
Liga Portugal 2 players
Regionalliga players
German expatriate footballers
Expatriate footballers in Portugal
German expatriate sportspeople in Portugal
Footballers from Saxony